United Stars Football Club is an association football club based in wajir, Kenya. The club currently competes in the Kenyan National Super League, and plays its home games at the wajir Stadium.

The club was known as Outgrowers Football Club until the 2013 season of FKF Division One.

References

External links 
Livescore.cz
Soccervista

Kenyan National Super League clubs
FKF Division One clubs
Football clubs in Kenya